Inderjit Badhwar (born 1943) is an Indian journalist, novelist and the former editor of India Today.

He has written for various Indian and American newspapers and magazines, including The New York Times and Outlook.

Now based in New Delhi, Badhwar heads India Legal, India's first politico-legal weekly magazine.

Bibliography

References

External links
 India Legal profile

1943 births
Living people
Indian male journalists
Columbia University alumni
Writers from Delhi
20th-century Indian writers
21st-century Indian writers
Indian novelists
Indian journalists
Indian non-fiction writers
People from Uttar Pradesh